Jacob Sherman or Jake Sherman could refer to:

Jake Sherman (journalist) (born 1985), American political writer
Jake Sherman (pianist), American jazz musician